Old North may refer to:

Periods
Viking Age Scandinavia
Hen Ogledd, the Cumbric-speaking areas of northern England and southern Scotland in the Early Middle Ages

Places
Old North St. Louis, St. Louis, Missouri, U.S.
Old North Columbus, Columbus, Ohio, U.S.
Old North, a neighborhood in Tel Aviv, Israel

Structures
Old North Bridge, an American War of Independence site in Concord, Massachusetts, U.S.
Old North Building, a building of Georgetown University
Old North Church or Christ Church, a church on Salem Street, Boston, Massachusetts, U.S.
Second Church, Boston or Old North Church, a church in North Square, Boston, Massachusetts, U.S.
Old North Road, a Roman road in England
Old North Tower, University of Central Oklahoma, an educational building in Edmond, Oklahoma, listed on the National Register of Historic Places
Old North Church (Sierra Madre, California)

See also
 Old Nordic (disambiguation)
 Old Norse
 Old North Cemetery (disambiguation)